Hyde Park is a live music venue located in Osnabrück, Germany. It opened in 1976 and has hosted artists such as Magnum, Hawkwind, Morbid Angel, Girlschool, Krokus and Yngwie Malmsteen. Due to noise complaints, the actual location of the venue has changed over the years.

References

Further reading
 Harald Keller, Reiner Wolf (Hrsg.): „Hyde Park“-Memories. Ein Osnabrücker Musikclub und seine Geschichte(n). Oktober Verlag, Münster 2011.

External links

 Official website 

Music venues in Germany
1976 establishments in Germany
Tourist attractions in Osnabrück
Buildings and structures in Osnabrück